Max Farrand (March 29, 1869 – June 17, 1945) was an American historian who taught at several universities and was the first director of the Huntington Library.

Early life
He was born in Newark, New Jersey, United States. He graduated from Princeton (A.B., 1892; Ph.D., 1896).

Career
Farrand taught at Wesleyan University, then after several years at Stanford University, and a year at Cornell University, he became a professor of history at Yale University (1908–1925). His particular area of interest and expertise was the Founding Fathers, the organization of the United States after the American Revolutionary War. Farrand was also director of the Commonwealth Fund, founded in 1918 by Anna M. Harkness—widow of Stephen V. Harkness—an investor in Standard Oil who wanted to “do something for the welfare of mankind.”

Max Farrand also assisted philanthropist Henry E. Huntington to establish the Huntington Library, located on the historic Rancho Huerta de Cuati' in San Marino near Pasadena, California. After Huntington's death in 1927, Farrand became the library's first director, serving until 1941.

Professor Farrand made many contributions to historical publications during his lifetime, as well as writing the following books:
 Legislation of Congress for the Government of the Organized Territories of the United States, 1789–1895 (1896), his dissertation.
 Translation of Jellinek's Declaration of the Rights of Man and of Citizens (Translation from German to English) (1901)
 Records of Federal Convention of 1787 (three volumes, 1911) (vol. IV, published in 1937, remains under copyright; also reprinted in 1923, 1927 and 1934)
 The Framing of the Constitution of the United States (1913)
 Development of the United States (1918)
 The Fathers of the Constitution (1921)
 The Founders Of The Union (1926)

He was elected in 1926 a Fellow of the American Association for the Advancement of Science (AAAS).

In 1940, Farrand, as President of the American Historical Society delivered an address describing his views on history and the war then beginning, which he saw as a clash of civilizations.

Max Farrand's final work, an examination of the letters of Benjamin Franklin (removing transcription errors of its first editor, John Bigelow), was published posthumously.

Family
In 1913, while chairman of the history department at Yale University, Farrand married the renowned landscape architect Beatrix Farrand, niece of the novelist and socialite Edith Wharton. They remodeled her family's home, Reef Point Estate in Bar Harbor on Mount Desert Island in Maine, where they spent summers while Farrand held positions in California and lived in Montecito near Santa Barbara, California. They had no children. His brother was the researcher Livingston Farrand.

Death and legacy
The Farrands retired to Reef Point estate in Bar Harbor, which they planned to establish as an independent and self-perpetuating educational corporation. Max Farrand died there in 1945 and Beatrix Farrand established the foundation as they had planned. However, she came to realize in 1955, after a wildfire destroyed part of those gardens, that their plan for the foundation was impractical. She demolished the main house and uprooted the garden (John D. Rockefeller purchasing the azaleas for his own Asticou Azalea Garden in Northeast Harbor, Maine where they continue to flower), donated their extensive library and herbarium specimens to the University of California at Berkeley where researchers could more readily access it than in Maine, and lived the final three years of her life at Garland Farm nearby.

The Farrands are buried at Woodlawn Cemetery in New York City.

During the Bicentennial Celebrations, James Hutson, head of the Manuscripts Division of the Library of Congress, edited a revised edition of Farrand's four volume, The Records of the Federal Convention of 1787 (Yale University Press, 1976).

References

Sources
 New General Catalog of Old Books and Authors

External links
 
 
 

Princeton University alumni
American political writers
American male non-fiction writers
American historians
1869 births
1945 deaths
Wesleyan University faculty
Cornell University Department of History faculty
Presidents of the American Historical Association
People associated with the Huntington Library
People from Bar Harbor, Maine
Fellows of the American Association for the Advancement of Science